Sarah Elizabeth Tareen (née Foret) is a retired  American actress. She is known for her role as Sophie Kerr in Beautiful People.

Life and career 
Her first on-screen appearance was a role as Tina Paulson in an episode of the police procedural television series CSI: NY. 

In 2005, she joined the cast of the ABC Family show Beautiful People, as Sophie Kerr. She appeared in two 2006 films, Karla and Pope Dreams, and one 2008 film, American Crude. She also appeared in episodes of The Hard Times of RJ Berger and Zach Stone Is Gonna Be Famous, as well as the Criminal Minds episode, "Supply and Demand".

She had guest roles on the television shows Gilmore Girls (2004), Clubhouse (2005), Moonlight (2007) and The Mentalist (2009).

Filmography

References

External links

1984 births
American television actresses
Living people
Actresses from Baton Rouge, Louisiana
21st-century American actresses